Kozova (Ukrainian: Козова; Polish: Kozowa; Russian: Козо́ва) is an urban-type settlement in Ternopil Raion, Ternopil Oblast (province) of western Ukraine, in the area historically known as Galicia,  east of Berezhany, some  west of Ternopil and c.  southeast of Lviv. It hosts the administration of Kozova settlement hromada, one of the hromadas of Ukraine. The settlement is situated beside a lake on the Koropets River (“little carp”). There is presumption that the name Kozova comes from the Ukrainian word koza (goat), though other possible sources exist.  Population:

History 
From 1350 to 1772 and again from 1919 to 1939, it was part of Poland. The first partition of Poland in 1772 attributed Galicia to the Habsburg monarchy. See more details in the article Kingdom of Galicia and Lodomeria. The Polish name Kozowa was used until 1939.

During the Kerensky Offensive the Armoured Car Expeditionary Force of the British Royal Navy Air Service established their forward operating base here, close to the headquarters of the 41st Corps of the Russian Imperial Army.

Kozova was part of the Soviet Union from 1939 to 1991, interrupted by the period of German occupation, 1941 to 1944. 
 
The population in 1939 was about 5,000, including many Poles and Jews. Upon the German occupation following Operation Barbarossa, the extermination of the town's Jewish population began. About 1,000 Jews were deported from Kozova to the Belzec death camp on 21 September 1942. In April 1943, another 1,000 Kozova Jews were shot by Germans, and in June 1943, 400 more Jews were executed by the Nazis. All are buried in a mass grave in Kozova. After the war's end, the remaining population was almost exclusively Ukrainian, with only a few Poles, Jews and Russians.

The Weingarten family, influential in Canadian and New York real estate, emigrated from Kozova at the turn of the century.

Until 18 July 2020, Kozova served as the administrative center of Kozova Raion. The raion was abolished in July 2020 as part of the administrative reform of Ukraine, which reduced the number of raions of Ternopil Oblast to three. The area of Kozova Raion was merged into Ternopil Raion.

Economy 
Kozova Dairy is a major dairy enterprise, with a butter plant that processes 50 tons of milk daily. AGRO Ltd. from Lviv holds majority positions in Kozova Dairy. The town also is known for the sugar refinery, one of the main ones of the region.

Communications 
The telephone code for Kozova and the Kozova district is +380 3547. Kozova telephone information service (called Dovidkova in Ukrainian): +380 3547 21222

Monuments
Ukrainian Greek-Catholic Church Church of Assumption of Theotokos (1885), saint Peter and Paul (2007), saint Basil Great (2001).
Belfry of Holy Spirit Church in village of Koniukhy, Kozova district.  
Holy Spirit Church in village of Koniukhy, Kozova district.
Monument to Taras Shevchenko (classical Ukrainian writer and poet) in front of Kozova Children Arts School (Khudozhnya Shkola)

See also 
 Shtetl, a small town with a large Jewish population in pre-Holocaust Central and Eastern Europe.

References

External links
 List of Jewish surnames from Kozova
 Map of western Ukraine with Kozova marked on it
 Kozova images and history
 

Urban-type settlements in Ternopil Raion
Holocaust locations in Ukraine